Smyer is a town in Hockley County, Texas, United States. It was founded in 1917 and finished  construction in 1925. The population was 474 at the 2010 census. in 2022, the population is at 490 respectfully.

History

In 1902, Isaac L. Ellwood acquired  in Hockley and Lamb Counties and formed the Spade Ranch. The ranch's main headquarters were located in southeastern Lamb County, and the south pasture operations were headed up in eastern Hockley County, near present-day Smyer. The town of Smyer was founded in 1917 when Clinton E. Smyer, a Santa Fe Railroad division superintendent signed documents with William Leonard Ellwood for ownership of the landscape. This was a time around when Mr. Ellwood started selling portions of the Spade Ranch to farmers. The town finished construction in 1924 and was deemed platted in 1925 after many people soon occupied the area. The town built many useful items over the years such as stores, a steam gin, a lumberyard, and a filling station. The town organized a budget for the town so they could add on and as they progressed into the future. In 1927, Smyer was building more additions to the town alongside a post office in the back of the Woolam store, which allowed mail to be easily delivered. By the early 1930s, Smyer picked up on new technology for the school and other homes around for good use and better conditions. Smyer had the school building added on over the course of many years, which made it harder for some of the pupils in the building to do good due to the constant renovations. In 1947, Smyer had 5 business and a planned construction of a new section of schooling area for younger grades, which would complete the school in preparation for an end date in 1951. In 1957, Byron Terrel, the superintendent at the time was welcomed by many happy townspeople and Texas senators for a speech about the amazing advanced technology that the school possessed, making Smyer the first of it's county to have these new facilities. In the 1970s, the schools were redone and connected after major construction happened on the building's architecture and mainframe adding a new high school area, office, board room, gymnasium, and auditorium advancements. The school had to use different tactics to be able to continue teaching, even with the constant rebuilding of the school. In 2022, Smyer was awarded the Blue Ribbon Schools award after pushing through the COVID-19 pandemic and performing at a high level of teaching and learning. The school is one of the most important parts of the town, as most activities take place at the school such as sports, meetings, band performances, and other antics. Today, Smyer continues to improve students and strive for a major degree in teaching and skills, making them a top school in the area.

Geography

Smyer is located on the high plains of the Llano Estacado at  (33.5842563, –102.1632291), in eastern Hockley County. Texas State Highway 114 passes through the southern side of the town, leading west  to Levelland, the county seat, and east  to Lubbock.

Demographics

As of the census of 2020, 481 people, 187 households, and 152 families resided in the town. The population density was 617.3 people per square mile (237.6/km). The 215 housing units averaged 276.5 per square mile (106.4/km). The racial makeup of the town was 81.88% White, 2.08% African American, 1.25% Native American, 13.12% from other races, and 1.67% from two or more races. Hispanics or Latinos of any race were 29.17% of the population.

Of the 187 households, 39.1% had children under the age of 18 living with them, 55.9% were married couples living together, 17.9% had a female householder with no husband present, and 20.7% were not families. About 19.6% of all households were made up of individuals, and 10.1% had someone living alone who was 65 years of age or older. The average household size was 2.68 and the average family size was 3.04.

In the town, the population was distributed as 32.1% under the age of 18, 6.0% from 18 to 24, 27.3% from 25 to 44, 21.9% from 45 to 64, and 12.7% who were 65 years of age or older. The median age was 37 years. For every 100 females, there were 94.3 males. For every 100 females age 18 and over, there were 84.2 males.

The median income for a household in the town was $30,667, and for a family was $32,000. Males had a median income of $23,594 versus $20,313 for females. The per capita income for the town was $11,784. About 16.4% of families and 17.3% of the population were below the poverty line, including 26.9% of those under age 18 and 3.8% of those age 65 or over.

Education
The town is served by the Smyer Independent School District. The Principal of the Elementary School is Mr. Pond. The Principal of the High School is Mr. Schaap, and the Superintendent of Smyer is Mr. Chris Wade

See also
Spade Ranch (Texas)
Llano Estacado
Caprock Escarpment

References

External links
Handbook of Texas: Smyer, TX

Towns in Hockley County, Texas
Towns in Texas